Chahar Taq (also Romanized as Chahār Ţāq) is a village in Bakhtajerd Rural District, in the Central District of Darab County, Fars Province, Iran. At the 2006 census, its population was 95, in 20 families.

References 

Populated places in Darab County